Harry Sokal may refer to:

 Harry R. Sokal (1898–1979), Romanian-born German film producer
 Harry Sokal (musician) (born 1954), Austrian jazz saxophonist